Venu V. Desom (Malayalam:വേണു വി ദേശം; born May 1959 at Desom village, Aluva, Kerala, India) is a Malayalam poet, novelist, lyricist, and translator. He was the first Malayalam poet to write gazals in Malayalam. Apart from original works many of which have received Awards, he has also translated works of various classic writers into Malayalam, including those of Fyodor Dostoevsky, Schopenhauer, Leo Tolstoy, Khalil Gibran, Osho, Jiddu Krishnamurti, and Vladimir Korolenko.

Works
Poetry (കവിതകൾ):-
Nilaykkatha Kazhchakal (നിലയ്ക്കാത്ത കാഴ്ചകൾ) - 1991
Aadiroopangal (ആദിരൂപങ്ങൾ) - 1981,
Rathribhootham (രാത്രിഭൂതം) - 1983
Dhyani (ധ്യാനി)-2002
Mohaandhakaarasanchaari  (മോഹാന്ധകാരസഞ്ചാരി) - 2011

Novels :-
Russian Christhu - Logos publishers - 2016. A novel based on Dostoyevsky
Priyappetta Leo - Green books - 2016—A novel based on Leo Tolstoy
Pranayajeevitham = Biography of Dostoyevsky (DC books 2018)
Ariyappedatha Dostoyevsky

Translations :-
19 works of Dostoyevsky include The Raw Youth, Idiot, Crime and Punishment,  Eternal Husband,  Gentle Spirit, Dream of Ridiculous Man
Memories of Anna Dostoyevsky (അന്നയുടെ ഓർമ്മകൾ, അന്നയുടെ കുറിപ്പുകൾ)
Memories of Sophia Tolstoy (to be published)
Mystic works of Tagore, Lalleshwari, Khalil Gibran, and Jnaneshwar
3 works of Leo Tolstoy

Lyricist:-
He wrote lyrics for the FIRST Malayalam gazal album " Pranamam",  sung by Umbayee -  released in 1998
Also wrote  lyrics for the film Capachino 2017, sung by P Jayahandran,

Awards :-

Kesari Award
Khazak Award
Won the award for complete contribution to Malayalam from Adwaithasram Centenary Committee (2014)
Prof Kaliyath Damodaran Puraskaram (2016)
 Esenin Award for popularising Russian Literature in India- Award jointly instituted by the Russian House Kerala and the Moscow State Esenin Museum.(2021)

See also
 List of Indian writers

References

External links
facebook

Indian male poets
1959 births
Living people
Poets from Kerala
People from Aluva